Barilius vagra is a fish in genus Barilius of the family Cyprinidae.

Description
This fish can grow to around 12.5 cm and is found in gravelly hill streams in Afghanistan, Pakistan, India, Nepal, Bangladesh and Sri Lanka.

References 

vagra
Fish described in 1822